Jordan Youngberg (born 1990/1991) is an American politician and businessman who represented District 8 in the South Dakota Senate from 2017 to 2020. In June 2020, Youngberg resigned from the Senate to work for the South Dakota State Treasurer.

Early life and education 
Youngberg was born in Dell Rapids, South Dakota and attended South Dakota State University.

Career 
Jordan Youngberg, a Republican, ran against Democratic incumbent State Senate member Scott Parsley, defeating him in the general election by a vote of 5869 to 5775. He served in the Senate until his resignation in 2020 to work for the South Dakota State Treasurer. Youngberg was succeeded by Casey Crabtree.

References 

21st-century American politicians
Living people
People from Dell Rapids, South Dakota
Republican Party South Dakota state senators
Year of birth missing (living people)